Onion From the Boot of a Benz is a 2015 Chinese comedy film directed by Guo Minger. It was released on January 27, 2015.

Cast
Zhou Dehua
Han Xuewei
Dong Lifan
Yu Fei
Lu Yang
Wang Hao
Biligtü
Wang Zhengquan
Tang Dagang
Wang Peilu

Reception
By January 29, the film had earned  at the Chinese box office.

References

2015 comedy films
Chinese comedy films
2010s Mandarin-language films